"Psychotic Reaction" is a song by the American garage rock band Count Five, released in June 1966 on their debut studio album of the same name.

Background
"Psychotic Reaction" was born out of an instrumental that Count Five played for six months before their manager Sol Ellner, Kenn Ellner's father, suggested that rhythm guitarist John "Sean" Byrne" write lyrics for it. Inspiration came in early 1966 when Byrne was seated in a health education class during his freshmen year at San Jose City College in California. As his professor lectured about psychosis and neurosis, Byrne's friend Ron Lamb, seated next to him, leaned over and whispered, "You know what would be a great name for a song? Psychotic Reaction!" Byrne later stated, "That was the missing punch-line for the song". He finished the lyrics and presented them to the rest of the group at band practice that night.

When the band played the song live a few weeks later at a dance at West Valley College, local KLIV disc jockey Brian Lord, emceeing the event, was very impressed. After a few pointed suggestions on rearranging the tune for a punchier sound, Lord landed the group auditions with several record labels, most of whom turned them down flat. Lord then put the band in touch with a couple of friends in Los Angeles, Hal Winn and Joe Hooven, who were about to start their own label, Double Shot Records. The band drove down to meet them at Decca Studios on Melrose Avenue. They were accompanied by Lord, who had the group begin the audition with some of their other songs before dramatically unveiling "Psychotic Reaction".

Composition 
"Psychotic Reaction" begins with a pentatonic fuzz guitar riff based around the note F♯; it is played by lead guitarist John "Mouse" Michalski. Musicologist Michael Hicks noted the opening riff's similarities with that of Johnny Rivers' rendition of "The Seventh Son", released the previous year. Author Steve Waksman wrote that the treble-laden quality of the fuzztone was resemblant of the Electric Prunes' "I Had Too Much to Dream (Last Night)" and, more fundamentally, the Rolling Stones' "(I Can't Get No) Satisfaction". Accompanying the riff is drummer Craig "Butch" Atkinson playing a rhythmic monad on the bass drum along with Kenn Ellner's warbling harmonica. Also similar to "Satisfaction", the lead riff gives way to a less abrasive two-chord progression – played by Byrne on a Danelectro Bellzouki – oscillating between the I (tonic) and ♭VII (subtonic) chord and giving the lyrical section a bouncy feel.

The lyrics of "Psychotic Reaction" concern the common garage rock theme of frustrated male desire, bemoaning the loss of "the best girl that I've ever had" and proclaiming "I can't get your love, I can't get a fraction", which ultimately provokes the psychotic reaction of the song's title. At the end of the first verse, Byrne shouts "And it feels like this", which leads into a double time section – described by commentators as a "rave-up" or "freak-out" section – that serves as a musical analogy of the mental disturbance and disorientation of the singer's condition. The rave-up has frequently led to comparisons between the song and the music of the Yardbirds, particularly their 1965 cover of Bo Diddley's "I'm a Man", although Byrne claimed that they had no influence on the song. The chaotic and tension-filled episode features a pulsating bass line played by Roy Chaney and reverb-laced palm muted strums from Byrne's guitar, ascending in pitch for about forty-five seconds before a climactic drum fill brings the band back for a second and final verse that reiterates the singer's unsatisfied longings. After the verse closes, the lead riff returns momentarily before a copy of the rave-up, spliced onto the end of the track, plays during the fade out.

Release and commercial performance
Irwin Zucker, the promotions director for Double Shot, waved "Psychotic Reaction" as the band's first release. The label originally considered another song by the band, "They're Gonna Get You", which was eventually decided to be the B-side. The single was issued in June 1966, on the same day that Ellner and Chaney graduated from Pioneer High School in San Jose. Over the next few months, the song gained heavy airplay on radio stations across the United States and began rapidly ascending the singles charts. The band were initially unaware of the song's success; Byrne said that the first time he heard it on the radio it was announced as the station's "most requested song", while Michalski recalled hearing it on three Bay Area stations at the same time. The single peaked at number 5 on the Billboard Hot 100 in October 1966 and at number 3 on the Canadian RPM 100 later that month. "Psychotic Reaction" was among the first successful acid (or psychedelic rock) songs, containing the characteristics that would come to define acid rock: the use of feedback and distortion replacing early rock music's more melodic electric guitars.

To capitalize on the success of the single, Double Shot immediately pressured the band to record a full-length album. As a strategic decision, their debut album was also titled Psychotic Reaction, released in October 1966, including seven new songs composed mostly by John Byrne.

Critical reception
Richie Unterberger in Allmusic said: "the verses are thus almost stereotypical sub-British blues-rock, yet have a hypnotic groove of their own, and the vocals have a respectably sullen power, if in a somewhat downer frame of mind (in accordance with the lyrics about being depressed and romantically rejected)".

The song was included in the Rock and Roll Hall of Fame's list of the "500 Songs That Shaped Rock and Roll". In 2014, the song placed seventh on Pastes list of the "50 Best Garage Rock Songs of All Time".

Usage in media

This song appears in the games Battlefield Vietnam (2004), Mafia 3 (2016), and Far Cry 5 (2018).

"Psychotic Reaction" has been featured in films such as Marek Kanievska's Less than Zero (1987), Gus Van Sant's Drugstore Cowboy (1989), Paul Schrader´s  Auto Focus (2002) and Randall Miller´s CBGB (2013), and has done very well on Classic Rock radio.

The song is also featured in the second-season episode "Bad Friend" from the HBO series Girls and the tenth episode "Alibi" from the HBO series Vinyl, and in an IKEA television advert on UK's Channel 4 (May 2019).

Cover versions
Because of its inclusion on the original Pebbles compilation album, probably the best known of the many obscure covers of this song that were made in the 1960s is the one by Positively 13 O'Clock (i.e., Jimmy Rabbitt with members of Mouse and the Traps and others) in 1967. The song has been covered by Brenton Wood, on his 1967 album Oogum Boogum. It was also recorded by the 1960s studio-only band, The Leathercoated Minds, in 1966 on their album A Trip Down the Sunset Strip.

The song is one of the many songs quoted and parodied on the 1976 album The Third Reich 'n Roll by the avantgarde group The Residents. "Psychotic Reaction" was also covered during the 1970s by The Radiators from Space (B-side to "Enemies", 1977) and by Television, who included the song in their early sets which emphasized the "rave-up" section. Covers made during the 1980s include a live version by The Cramps on their 1983 live mini-album, Smell of Female and by artist Nash the Slash. The Nash the Slash version was released on his 1984 album American Bandages, inserting paraphrased excerpts of John Hinckley's letter to Jodie Foster, as well as lines from the movie "Taxi Driver", between the verses.

Horror punk/metal band Haunted Garage covered the song on their 1991 album Possession Park. Other cover versions include a live version by The Fuzztones and a version by The Vibrators on their album Garage Punk (2009). This song is also played live by Tom Petty and the Heartbreakers on the Playback box set and seen in the currently out of print concert video, "Take the Highway" sung by drummer Stan Lynch. The Night Beats from Seattle, Washington have claimed to have "psychically inherited" the song and have made it their own playing it most nights of their 2011 U.S. and European dates.

Personnel
Count Five
 John "Sean" Byrne - vocals & rhythm guitar
John "Mouse" Michalski - fuzz guitar
 Craig "Butch" Atkinson - drums
 Kenn Ellner - harmonica
 Roy Chaney - Fender bass guitar

Notes

References

Citations

Sources

External links
List of "Psychotic Reaction" cover versions

1966 debut singles
1966 songs
Count Five songs
Protopunk songs